Proanthocyanidin dimers are a specific type of proanthocyanidin, which are a class of flavanoids. They are oligomers of flavan-3-ols.

 Dimeric B-type proanthocyanidins
 Dimeric A-type proanthocyanidins

Dimers